Troy Clarke may refer to:

Troy Clarke (Australian rules footballer), AFL footballer
Troy Clarke (rugby league), NRL player